The following games were initially announced as PlayStation titles, however were subsequently cancelled or postponed indefinitely by developers or publishers.

References

1

PlayStation